Equator  was a two-masted pygmy trading schooner known for carrying passengers Robert Louis Stevenson and Fanny Vandegrift Stevenson on a voyage through the islands of Micronesia in 1889. She was later used a wire drag vessel for the Coast and Geodetic Survey organization, and finally as a tugboat along the Puget Sound until her abandonment in 1956. Equator was left to decay as part of a breakwater before she was saved in the 1960s. Efforts to restore her ultimately failed, leaving her remains under an enclosed structure in a decaying state.

History

Career
Shipbuilder Matthew Turner designed and built Equator as a two-masted schooner in Benecia, California in 1888 for the copra trade in the South Seas. In mid 1889, Robert Louis Stevenson and Fanny Vandegrift Stevenson chartered the Equator in Hawaii for extended South Pacific cruising. Stevenson learned alot about sea life from his voyage which later influenced his books Treasure Island and The Wrecker. He ultimately took up residence in Samoa which was reached by the Equator. Sometime in the 1890s she received a steam engine and worked as a tender for either an Arctic whaling fleet or for fishing operations in Alaska. Equator was later enlarged, and lost her bowsprit when she was purchased by Carey-Davis Co. in 1915. During this phase of her career she was used as a wire drag vessel for the Coast and Geodetic Survey organization. 

Equator was later converted to gasoline engines sometime in the 1920s, but in 1923 she ran aground on the Quillayute Bar. It remains unclear when Equator was converted into a tugboat as sources give dates of 1916, 1923, and 1941 all as possibilities. In any case, she was completely renovated in 1923, and received a diesel engine in 1941. Equator spent her final years as a tugboat for use in the Puget Sound until 1956, when she was abandoned on the coast of Jetty Island outside Everett. She was then left to decay for the next 11 years as part of a breakwater with other discarded vessels.

Restoration efforts
The first efforts to save the Equator were led by Everett dentist Eldon Schalka in the 1960s. Eventually he was able to mobilize enough volunteers from the Everett Kiwanis Club in to haul the vessel ashore and clean the muck out of her sometime in June 1967. She was then dry-docked at the 14th Street Fisherman’s Boat Shop in Everett. A survey conduced on February 21, 1968 by the National Register of Historical Places gave the following description (with recommendations) of the ship's condition at the time:

Schalka helped to establish a nonprofit group to restore the vessel, which despite little fundraising success managed to get the Equator listed to the National Register of Historic Places on April 14, 1972. This was the first Everett property to receive this designation. The foundation ultimately tried but failed to raise enough money to restore the vessel which eventually became an eyesore for the local community. By the late 1980s, Equator had been reduced to a crumbling hull and was moved to its present location at the corner of 10th Street and Craftsman Way. The foundation that Schalka had started was finally dissolved after his death in 1992 from a plane crash.

Uncertain future
Equator initially sat under a makeshift structure which was exposed on all sides, leaving her exposed to the elements. Eventually her back side collapsed in November 2017 which led the Port of Everett to enclose the shelter around the schooner to protect her from further decay. Equator remains in a fragile state as she can't be moved or preserved in place, to complicate matters more she is also described as an "orphan" with no legal owner. There is currently a makeshift open air museum in place for Equator which includes the National Register plaque and an interpretive sign, as well as a list of donors to the Equator Foundation.

See also
Historic preservation
List of Registered Historic Places in Washington

References

External links

Silverado Museum, California, devoted to Robert Louis Stevenson
The Writers' Museum, Edinburgh, Scotland, The United Kingdom, which holds photographs and documents of Robert Louis Stevenson

1888 ships
Merchant ships of the United States
Museum ships in Washington (state)
Robert Louis Stevenson
Schooners of the United States
Ships on the National Register of Historic Places in Washington (state)
Historic American Engineering Record in Washington (state)
National Register of Historic Places in Everett, Washington
Ships built in San Francisco
History of Micronesia